Inheritance was a 1967 Granada produced ITV drama based on a trilogy of novels by Phyllis Bentley - Inheritance (1932), The Rise of Henry Morcar (1946) and A Man of His Time (1966).

The ten-part period drama revolved around the fortunes of the Oldroyds, a Yorkshire mill owning family from 1812 to 1965. The early part of the series featured the Luddite riots involving the burning of mills and the subsequent execution of those responsible. The series turned the expression "There's trouble at mill" into a catchphrase.

The series featured Michael Goodliffe, John Thaw and James Bolam in leading roles over the generations. Each new generation saw Goodliffe and Thaw playing father and eldest son with Bolam usually playing the part of the younger son.

Cast with original parts

 Michael Goodliffe as William Oldroyd
 Daphne Heard as Janie Smith-Oldroyd
 Royston Tickner as Charley Mellor
 Madeleine Christie as Charlotte Stancliffe
 John Thaw as Will Oldroyd
 Wilfred Pickles as mill overlooker
 Thelma Whiteley as Mary Bamforth
 Judy Wilson as Martha Ackroyd
 James Bolam as Joe Bamforth
 David Burke as Henry Morcar
 Basil Dignam as Mr. Shaw

External links
 

1967 British television series debuts
1967 British television series endings
1960s British drama television series
ITV television dramas
1960s British television miniseries
Television series by ITV Studios
Television shows produced by Granada Television
English-language television shows